Abdul Hadi al-Majali (28 June 1934 – 10 February 2021) was a Jordanian politician, who served as the Speaker of the Parliament of Jordan from 1998 to 2009. He also served as Ambassador of Jordan to the United States from 1981 to 1985 and Minister of Public Works and Housing from 1995 to 1996. Al-Majali was first elected to the Parliament of Jordan in 1993 and served till 2010.

Al-Majali died from COVID-19 during the COVID-19 pandemic in Jordan.

References

1934 births
2021 deaths
Deaths from the COVID-19 pandemic in Jordan
Members of the House of Representatives (Jordan)
Speakers of the House of Representatives (Jordan)
Government ministers of Jordan
Jordanian people of Palestinian descent
People from Gaza City